Alvise Gritti (born 29 September 1480, died 1534), whose first name may also be spelled Aloisio, Lodovico, Ludovico, Luigi or Louis (Hungarian Lajos), was a Venetian politician. He was influential in the Hungarian Kingdom under the reign of King John I of Hungary. He was also a minister of the Ottoman sultan, and regent of Hungary from 1530 to 1534. He was the natural son of Andrea Gritti, the Venetian Bailo of Constantinople during the reign of Sultan Bayezid II and who later became the Doge of Venice in 1523.

Youth 
Gritti’s father, Andrea, lived in Constantinople as a grain merchant for about twenty years before returning as a diplomat on behalf of Venice. During this time Andrea had multiple sons with a Greek mistress. Alvise was one of these sons. The commonly cited number of sons is four, Pietro, Alvise, Lorenzo, and Zorzi; however, Eric Dursteler mentions only three, citing one of Gritti's father's political opponents who argued that "one who has three bastard sons in Turkey [i.e. Ottoman Empire] should not be made Doge." Given that names exist for four sons, it seems more likely that this piece of political invective left out a son than that historians have added a fourth. Regardless, Gritti spent his childhood in Constantinople. He studied at the University of Padua, likely after traveling from Constantinople with his father in 1502. As an illegitimate child, Gritti was unable to hold high-ranking positions in Venice, but this barrier did not exist in Constantinople, to which he returned in 1506.

Early career 
Stationing himself in Galata, across the Golden Horn from Constantinople, Gritti became involved in banking and trade, particularly with Venice. Though trading in a variety of goods, such as saltpeter, salt milk, clothes, saffron, tin, and wine, grain and gems were some of Gritti’s most prominent ventures. The former was imported to Venice, while the latter found a patron in the sultan. Gritti was thus involved in the creation and presentation of Suleiman the Magnificent’s golden Venetian helmet-crown. His success was evidenced by his luxurious palazzo, with expansive gardens, stables, and numerous servants, stables, as well as by extravagant garments and jewelry. His court was host to feasts and entertainments, as well as Italian merchants and humanists.

The origins of Gritti’s relationship with Ibrahim Pasha, who was appointed Grand Vizier to Suleiman in 1523, are unclear, but Gritti won favor with Ibrahim, who entrusted him with great responsibilities, making him a business partner. It is possible that Ibrahim Pasha was influenced by his childhood ties to Venice, as he was born on the Venetian island of Parga. Regardless, Ibrahim Pasha seems to have sought Gritti’s opinion on matters pertaining to foreign policy and him and the sultan are known to have visited Gritti’s house in Galata. Also in 1523 Gritti’s father ascended to the position of doge of Venice, a move that furthered Gritti’s political power. Gritti was known as the “Prince’s Son” and was likely partially responsible for Ibrahim Pasha’s favorable policies towards Venice.

In 1527 Gritti supported King John I of Hungary against Ferdinand I of Habsburg, who wanted the crown for himself. He soon became one of the most important allies of King John and served as ambassador between the monarch and the Turkish sultan. In 1528 the grand vizier, according to reports, planned to take him on the projected campaign into Hungary where Gritti was to get "an important archbishopric plus a piece of the archduchy of Austria once the Turks had taken them." Lodovico stayed in the city of Buda first as King John's advisor, and then between 1530 and 1534 as regent of Hungary.

Attempted coup 
On 9 November 1533, the governor of Marano wrote to Charles V, Holy Roman Emperor, "I heard a few days ago that the Captain-General of Croatia apprehended and sent to (your brother's city of) Ljubljana two of Gritti's spies.  They have confessed that Gritti, in the name of the Turkish Emperor, has made an alliance with the kings of England and France and also with several other princes against His Imperial and Royal Majesties (Charles and his brother Ferdinand, then King of Bohemia) and the rest of Christendom.  In consequence of this the armies of the Turk, consisting of about 1,500 light horse and 22,000 hackbutiers—the whole force to be paid by the king of France—are about to invade Christendom. And it is the opinion of one of the spies that Gritti himself with his confederates will invade Croatia, Slavonia, and Hungary, and try if he can conquer those countries. Meanwhile the dukes of Bavaria and Wurtemberg and the count (landgrave) of Hesse will create disturbances in Germany, and so distress Christendom that His Imperial Majesty will find himself in trouble."

Gritti's attempt to take over Transylvania caused a general uprising but in the end he was killed along with his two sons at the siege of Medgyes. His remains were buried in the church of St. Francis in Mediaș in modern-day Romania.

References

Further reading
Peter G. Bietenholz, Thomas B. Deutscher (2003). Contemporaries of Erasmus: a biographical register.
Heinrich Kretschmayr: Ludovico Gritti: Eine Monographie. BiblioBazaar. July 2009 [1923]. .
Albert Lybyer (1913). Government of the Ottoman Empire in the Time of Suleiman the Magnificent.
Ferenc Szakaly (1995).   Lodovico Gritti in Hungary: 1529-1534: a historical insight.

1480 births
1534 deaths
Politicians from Istanbul
Alvise
University of Padua alumni
Republic of Venice nobility
Republic of Venice diplomats
Political people from the Ottoman Empire
16th-century Venetian people
16th-century people from the Ottoman Empire
People from the Ottoman Empire of Greek descent
Italian people of Greek descent
Businesspeople from Istanbul